William Bennett Fuller (9 April 1883 – 25 July 1957) was an All Blacks rugby union player from New Zealand.  He was a five-eighth and threequarter. 
 
He played six matches for the All Blacks including two tests; scoring 15 points (5 tries) for New Zealand in 1910, including one test try (3 points).

He was born and died in Christchurch.

References

1883 births
1957 deaths
New Zealand rugby union players
New Zealand international rugby union players
Rugby union fly-halves
Rugby union players from Christchurch